Arakuzha is a small village situated 6 km from Muvattupuzha in Kerala, India. The SH 41 connects Arakuzha with Muvattupuzha and Koothattukulam and Moozhi bridge connects Arakuzha to pineapple city of India, Vazhakulam town which is also 6 km from Arakuzha. It is located on SH 41 towards Koothattukulam, the alternate route for Main Central Road. St. Mary's High School and St. Joseph’s girls' school are the oldest high school in Arakuzha. Arakuzha is also home to two Christian pilgrim centres-St. Mary’s Forane Church and Malekurish Church. The chief festival is on the first Sunday after Easter.

History

The village has a large population of Syrian Catholic Christians. Marth Mariam Syro-Malabar Catholic Forane Church has an important role in the life of the people. Saint Thomas Christians of Arakuzha have more than 1,500 years of recorded history. This region comprising Kothamangalam, Vazhakulam, Arakuzha, Mylakompu, Nagapuzha, Muthalakodam of erstwhile Travancore kingdom has some very old Syrian churches. Arakuzha, being an ancient Syrian Christian centre has given asylum to many migrant Syrian Christians during the Tipu's persecution of Nasranis. Venerable Mar Varghese Payyappilly Palakkappilly had served as the parish priest of Marth Mariam Church in Arakuzha (1920-22). During his tenure in Arakuzha he started St. Mary's School there. He also purchased  of land in M.C.Road for constructing St. Joseph's Syro-Malabar Catholic Church, Meenkunnam.  

Several families migrated to different parts of Kerala, mainly to Malabar and high range areas, in search of agriculture land.

See also
 Muvattupuzha
 Kothamangalam
 Ernakulam
 Mailacompu
 Puthenchira

References

Villages in Ernakulam district